Senator Yoakum may refer to:

Charles Henderson Yoakum (1849–1909), Texas State Senate
Henderson King Yoakum (1810–1856), Texas State Senate